Frisby may refer to:

People

Surname
Almah Jane Frisby (1857-1931), American physician and college professor
Edgar Frisby, American astronomer
Leander F. Frisby (1825-1889), American lawyer

Given name
 Frisby McCullough (1828-1862), Confederate officer executed during the American Civil War

Places
United Kingdom
Frisby, Leicestershire, or Frisby-by-Gaulby
Frisby on the Wreake, also in Leicestershire
United States
Frisby, Kentucky, an unincorporated community

Other
Frisby (restaurant), a Colombian fried chicken restaurant
A misspelling of the Frisbee flying disc
Mrs. Frisby, a field mouse who is the title character of the book Mrs. Frisby and the Rats of NIMH
The Frisby stereotest, a test for stereopsis

A character from an episode of the Twilight. Season 3, episode 32. Hocus Pocus and Frisby.